Star Trek: Voyager is an American science fiction television series that debuted on UPN on January 16, 1995, and ran for seven seasons until May 23, 2001. The show was the fourth live-action series in the Star Trek franchise.
This is a list of actors who have appeared on Star Trek: Voyager

Cast

Main cast 

 Kate Mulgrew as Kathryn Janeway, commanding officer of the USS Voyager.
 Robert Beltran as Chakotay, Janeway's first officer and former member of the Maquis.
 Roxann Dawson as B'Elanna Torres, chief engineer and former member of the Maquis.
 Robert Duncan McNeill as Tom Paris, conn officer.
 Jennifer Lien as Kes, nurse and medical apprentice until her departure from Voyager in 2374.
 Ethan Phillips as Neelix, chef, morale officer, and later Federation Ambassador to the Delta Quadrant.
 Robert Picardo as The Doctor, chief medical officer.
 Tim Russ as Tuvok, chief security/tactical officer.
 Jeri Ryan as Seven of Nine, stellar cartography and former Borg drone liberated from the Collective.
 Garrett Wang as Harry Kim, operations officer.

Recurring cast 

 Simon Billig as Hogan, engineering officer and former member of the Maquis until his death in 2373.
 Josh Clark as Joe Carey, engineering officer until his death in 2378.
 Anthony De Longis as Jal Culluh, First Maje of the Kazon-Nistrim.
 John de Lancie as Q, a member of the Q-Continuum who frequently visits the USS Voyager.
 Christine Delgado as Susan Nicoletti, engineering officer.
 Brad Dourif as Lon Suder, engineering officer and former member of the Maquis until his death in 2373.
 Susan Patterson as Kaplan, security officer until her death in 2373.
 Alexander Enberg as Vorik, engineering officer.
 Tarik Ergin as Ayala, security officer, conn officer, and former member of the Maquis.
 Martha Hackett as Seska, Cardassian operative and Kazon collaborator until her death in 2373.
 Richard Herd as Owen Paris, flag officer at Starfleet Command, officer of the Pathfinder Project, and father of Tom Paris.
 Nancy Hower as Samantha Wildman, science officer.
 Manu Intiraymi as Icheb, a former Borg drone liberated from the Collective.
 Marley S. McClean as Mezoti, a former Borg drone liberated from the Collective.
 Derek McGrath as Chell, operations officer and former member of the Maquis.
 Zoe McLellan as Tal Celes, operations officer.
 Scarlett Pomers as Naomi Wildman, daughter of Samantha Wildman.
 John Rhys-Davies as the holographic recreation of Leonardo da Vinci.
 Raphael Sbarge as Michael Jonas, engineering officer and former member of the Maquis until his death in 2372.
 Martin Rayner as Doctor Chaotica, a holodeck character.
 Dwight Schultz as Reginald Barclay, officer at Starfleet Communications and the Pathfinder Project.
 Marina Sirtis as Deanna Troi, ship's counselor on the USS Enterprise-E.
 John Tampoya as Kashimuro Nozawa, operations officer.
 Susanna Thompson as The Borg Queen, leader of the Borg Collective.
 Cody Wetherill as Rebi, a former Borg drone liberated from the Collective.
 Kurt Wetherill as Azan, a former Borg drone liberated from the Collective.

Appearances
  = Main cast (credited) 
  = Recurring cast (4+)
  = Guest cast (1-3)

See also

 List of Star Trek: The Original Series cast members
 List of Star Trek: The Next Generation cast members
 List of Star Trek: Deep Space Nine cast members
 List of Star Trek: Enterprise cast members
 List of Star Trek: Discovery cast members

Notes

F: The character was played by Warren Munson in Seasons 2 and 5.
F:The character was played by uncredited babies in Seasons 2 and 3 and by Brooke Stephens in Season 4.
F:In the series finale, the character was played by Alice Krige.-

Footnotes

Star Trek: Voyager
Cast
cast of Voyager